The following is a timeline of the history of the city of Casablanca, Morocco.

Prior to 20th century

 1st C. CE - "Anfus" created by Romans as a port
 11th C. CE - Anfa founded by Zanata Berbers. The word Anfa means the hill in the local amazigh dialect .
 1468 - Anfa sacked by Portuguese forces.
 1770 - City walls rebuilt by the Sultan Mohammed ben Abdallah also called Mohammed III (approximate date).
 1830 - Port re-opens to commerce.
 1900 - Population: 20,000.

20th century
 1906 - Port of Casablanca construction begins. 
 1907
 30 July: Anti-European unrest; crackdown by French forces.
 Casa-Port Railway Terminal opens.
 1912
 French protectorate established.
 1914 - Population: 78,000.
 1915 - The Franco-Moroccan Fair runs  from 5 September to 5 November
 1918 - Public library opens.
 1923 - Casa-Voyageurs Railway Station opened.
 1927 - Population: 120,000.
 1929 - Casablanca Stock Exchange established.
 1935 - Vox Cinema opens.
 1937 : Wydad Club Athletic formed
 1942 - American fictional movie Casablanca released.
 1943 - January: Allied Casablanca Conference held.
 1949 - Raja Club Athletic formed.
 1951 - Population: 682,388.
 1952 - December: "Anti-French riots."
 1959 - Afriquia SMDC oil company headquartered in Casablanca.
 1960 - Population: 967,000 (urban agglomeration).
 1965
 22 March: "Uprising of students and workers."
 September: 1965 Arab League summit held.
 1971 - Maroc Soir newspaper begins publication.
 1973 - Population: 1,371,330 city; 1,753,400 urban agglomeration.
 1975 - University of Hassan II Casablanca established.
 1980s - City "organized into five separate prefectures."
 1980
 Planning commission formed.
 Population: 2,109,000 (urban agglomeration).
 1981 - 6 June: "Bread riots."
 1986 - Meeting of the Association Internationale des Maires Francophones held in city.
 1989 - 1989 Jeux de la Francophonie held in Casablanca.
 1990 - Population: 2,682,000 (urban agglomeration).
 1993
 Hassan II Mosque built.
 Population: 2,943,000 urban agglomeration (estimate).
 1999 - l’Boulevard des Jeunes Musicians hip hop festival begins.
 2000 - Population: 2,937,000 (urban agglomeration).

21st century

 2003
 16 May: 2003 Casablanca bombings.
 Mohamed Sajid becomes mayor.
 2007 - March–April: 2007 Casablanca bombings.
 2012
 May: "Trade union rally."
 Casablanca tramway begins operating.
 2014: 3,352,399 inhabitants in the city (estimate) and almost seven million in the metropolitan area according to the official census of 2014.
 2015 - City becomes part and capital of the Casablanca-Settat administrative region.

See also
 History of Casablanca
 Timelines of other cities in Morocco: Fes, Marrakesh, Meknes, Rabat, Tangier

References

This article incorporates information from the French Wikipedia.

Bibliography

in English
  (written in the 16th century)

in French

External links

  (Bibliography of open access  articles)
 
 Map of Casablanca, 1942.
 
  (Bibliography)

Casablanca
Casablanca